John Dickson McMillan (January 27, 1919 – November 20, 1981) was an American football, basketball, and baseball coach. He served as the head football coach at the University of South Carolina in 1945, Erskine College from 1947 to 1951, and The Citadel from 1953 to 1954. McMillan was also the head basketball coach at South Carolina during the 1944–45 season, winning the SoCon title, and the head baseball coach at the school in the spring of 1945. In the fall of 1945, he led the South Carolina Gamecocks football team to an invitation to the first Gator Bowl, where they lost, 26–14, to Wake Forest. McMillan also coached basketball and baseball at Erskine and led the basketball team to the 1949 NAIA basketball tournament.

McMillan was born in Fitzgerald, Georgia and graduated from the University of South Carolina in 1941. He died on November 20, 1981.

Head coaching record

College football

Basketball

References

External links
 

1919 births
1981 deaths
Basketball coaches from Georgia (U.S. state)
The Citadel Bulldogs athletic directors
The Citadel Bulldogs baseball coaches
The Citadel Bulldogs football coaches
Erskine Flying Fleet athletic directors
Erskine Flying Fleet baseball coaches
Erskine Flying Fleet football coaches
Erskine Flying Fleet men's basketball coaches
High school football coaches in South Carolina
People from Fitzgerald, Georgia
South Carolina Gamecocks baseball coaches
South Carolina Gamecocks football coaches
South Carolina Gamecocks men's basketball coaches
University of South Carolina alumni